Georgios Kanellopoulos (born 29 January 2000) is a Greek professional footballer who plays as a midfielder for Veikkausliiga club HJK.

References

2000 births
Living people
Greek footballers
Super League Greece players
Asteras Tripolis F.C. players
Association football midfielders
Sportspeople from Sparta, Peloponnese
Footballers from the Peloponnese